Kotla Kheri railway station is a small railway station in Khandwa district, Madhya Pradesh. Its code is KTKH. It serves Kotla Kheri village. The station consists of a single platform, not well sheltered. It lacks many facilities including water and sanitation. Recently gauge conversion started on this line. After conversion it will connect Indore to South India.

References 

Ratlam railway division
Railway stations in Khandwa district